Páraic Breathnach (born 1956) is an Irish actor, performer, writer and storyteller.

Biography
A fluent Irish speaker, Páraic grew up in Carna, County Galway. As a student in University College Galway, he was deeply involved with An Cumann Drámaíochta and Dramsoc, where he teamed up with Ollie Jennings in a series of groundbreaking cultural initiatives in and out of college. He worked with An Taibhdhearc and Druid Theatres and became the first manager of Galway Arts Centre, before co-founding Macnas with Ollie Jennings.

He has appeared in several major Irish films throughout the years, including Michael Collins and Breakfast on Pluto. A frequent contributor to TG4, he also played the character of Jacksie Walsh on RTÉ's Killinaskully.

He has also been the managing director of the Galway Arts Center.

In 2005 he was awarded an honorary degree from NUI Galway "for his immense contribution to cultural life in Galway and Ireland".

See also
 Breathnach

References

Further reading
 http://www.hotpress.com/Paraic-Breathnach/features/interviews/Paraic-Breathnach/2659109.html
 Macnas: Joyful Abandonment, Terry Dineen, The Liffey Press, 2007.

External links

1956 births
Living people
Alumni of the University of Galway
Irish male film actors
Irish male stage actors
Irish male television actors
Male actors from County Galway
Actors from County Mayo
TG4 presenters